Philip Marchington (October 28, 1736 – November 2, 1808) was a British-Canadian merchant and political figure in Nova Scotia. He represented Cumberland County in the Nova Scotia House of Assembly from 1786 to 1793.

Early life 
Marchington was born in Chapel-en-le-Frith in the High Peak district of Derbyshire, England. Philip was baptized on October 28, 1736 by Dr. James Clegg of Chinley Independent Chapel.

Career 
He was a United Empire Loyalist from Pennsylvania who came to Halifax in 1784. A leader of the Methodist church in the province, he built a church on his property. Marchington was elected to the provincial assembly after Christopher Harper was unseated because he was not a resident of Nova Scotia.

Death 
He died in Halifax in 1808, at the age of 72.

References 
 A Directory of the Members of the Legislative Assembly of Nova Scotia, 1758-1958, Public Archives of Nova Scotia (1958)

1808 deaths
Nova Scotia pre-Confederation MLAs
Canadian Methodists
1736 births